"Amor Clandestino" (English: "Clandestine Love") is the second single from Mexican Latin pop/Rock en Español band Maná's eighth studio album Drama y Luz. The song is produced by Fher Olvera & Alex González. The song reached number-one on the Hot Latin Songs chart. The song also reached number-one on the Mexican Airplay Charts according to Billboard International.

Music video
The music video for the song, which was directed by Pablo Croce
The video is divided into 3 acts which actors are the following, the guy called Paco Martinez Maldonado and the psychology called Estefania Arango.

Charts

Weekly charts

Year-end charts

References

2011 singles
Maná songs
Spanish-language songs
Songs written by Fher Olvera
Warner Music Latina singles
2011 songs